Shooks is an unincorporated community in Shooks Township, Beltrami County, Minnesota, United States.

The community is located northeast of Bemidji at the junction of Minnesota State Highways 1 and 72.

References

Further reading
Rand McNally Road Atlas - 2007 edition - Minnesota entry
Official State of Minnesota Highway Map - 2007/2008 edition

Unincorporated communities in Minnesota
Unincorporated communities in Beltrami County, Minnesota